M5 fiber (polyhydroquinone-diimidazopyridine or PIPD) is a high-strength synthetic fiber first developed by the Dutch chemical firm AkzoNobel. It is produced in the United States by the Magellan Systems International, which became a division of DuPont.

Preparation

M5 fiber is prepared by a condensation polymerization between tetraaminopyridine and dihydroxyterephthalic acid using diphosphorus pentoxide as a dehydrating agent. The polymer mixture is then heated and extruded to form brightly blue polymer fibers. The fibers are then washed extensively with water and base in order to remove the phosphoric acid generated by the hydration of diphosphorus pentoxide from the polymer.

To remove water from the fiber structure and enable the intermolecular hydrogen bonds to be created, thus increasing the strength of the polymer, the fiber is heated and exposed to controlled stress. This aligns the molecular structure of the fiber in a better configuration for tensile and compressive strength.

Properties

M5 has a tensile strength of 4 GPa to 9.5GPa,. Other aramids- (such as Kevlar and Twaron) or UHMWPE-fibres (such as Dyneema and Spectra) range from 2.2 to 3.9 GPa.

M5 has "very high levels" of fire resistance, flame retardancy, and chemical resistance, especially high for an organic fiber. It is less brittle than carbon fiber and will yield when stretched.

References

Synthetic fibers